Kingsley Esiso is a Nigerian lawyer and politician from Delta state. He is the Special Adviser to Governor Ifeanyi Okowa on Library Affairs. In May 2016, he was elected and currently serves as Chair of the Delta State People's Democratic Party.

Biography
Esiso was born in Okpara Inland in Ethiope East local government area of Delta State. He holds the title of the Oruese of Agbon Kingdom. His wife, Mrs. Esiso was conferred the Ughana of Agbon Kingdom by His Royal Majesty, Ukori 1st (JP), the Ovie of Agbon Kingdom.

References

Delta State politicians
State political party chairs of Nigeria
21st-century Nigerian lawyers
Living people
Year of birth missing (living people)